Lalu Muhammad Zohri (born 1 July 2000) is an Indonesian track and field sprinter. He is the first Indonesian male to win any medal at the IAAF World U20 Championships by winning a gold medal in the 100m. He is the current holder of the Indonesian 100m and 200m national records, and is labelled the "fastest man in Southeast Asia".

Biography
Zohri was born and raised in West Pemenang village of the Pemenang subdistrict in North Lombok Regency, on the eastern island of Lombok, in a house made of wood and woven bamboo. He is the youngest of four children. His mother died when he was in elementary school, and his father died when he was 17. He couldn't even afford shoes, prompting him to train barefoot. He convinced his sister to lend him Rp 400,000 (21 Euros) so he could buy a pair of spikes for his meets, although this partly came from his allowance. He won the 100 m at the 2018 Asian Junior Athletics Championships in Japan in a time of 10.27 seconds.

Zohri competed for Indonesia at the 2018 IAAF World U20 Championships in the 100 m. In the first round, he placed first with a time of 10.30 seconds. In semifinal 1, he placed second with a slightly better time at 10.24, behind World Youth 100m Record Holder and gold medal favorite Anthony Schwartz. He was drawn to lane eight in the final, which started less than three hours later. When the pistol fired, Zohri got a decent start, staying right behind Schwartz who led. He closed-in slowly at 60 metres, and in the last ten metres, he surged ahead of Schwartz to take the gold medal by a dip. His time of 10.18 seconds (+1.2 m/s) became an Indonesian junior record, just slightly different from Indonesian National Record at the time of 10.17 by Suryo Agung Wibowo at the 2009 Southeast Asian Games.

Zohri was labeled as a national hero for his deeds; Indonesian President Joko Widodo ordered two cabinet ministers to arrange for his house to be renovated.  Zohri is part of a contingent of high performing Indonesian athletes, coached by Harry Marra, a program designed to make Indonesia a competitive player in the international athletics scene.

On home soil in the 2018 Asian Games, he reached the finals but placed seventh with a time of 10.20 seconds in the 100 m. He and his fellow athletes won a silver medal in the 4 × 100 m relay, Zohri was the second runner. 

Following the Asian Games, Zohri participated in the inaugural event of the Malaysia Open Grand Prix, timing 10.20 seconds in the 100m race and winning gold. In the 2019 Asian Athletics Championships, Zohri recorded 10.13 seconds in 100m, placing second behind Japanese Yoshihide Kiryū. During the competition's semifinals, Zohri recorded 10.15 seconds, which was a new national record until the finals less than 150 minutes later. On 19 May 2019, Zohri further improved his record to 10.03 seconds as he won a bronze medal in the 2019 Seiko Golden Grand Prix in Osaka, breaking Southeast Asian records and securing a spot in the qualifications for the 2020 Tokyo Olympics.

He further broke the 200m national record in August 2019, when he finished at 20.81 seconds during the 200m finals of the 2019 Indonesian National Athletics Championship in Bogor, West Java. He represented Indonesia at the 100 metre race in the 2020 Summer Olympics, being eliminated in the qualifiers.

Awards and nominations

Statistics

Major international competitions

1Did not start in the semifinals

Personal bests
Outdoor
100 metres – 10.03	(+1.7 m/s, Osaka 2019)
200 metres – 20.81	(-0.7 m/s, Cibinong 2019)
Indoor
60 metres – 6.58 (Belgrade 2022)

References

External links

2000 births
Living people
Sportspeople from West Nusa Tenggara
Indonesian male sprinters
Athletes (track and field) at the 2020 Summer Olympics
Olympic athletes of Indonesia
Athletes (track and field) at the 2018 Asian Games
Asian Games silver medalists for Indonesia
Asian Games medalists in athletics (track and field)
Medalists at the 2018 Asian Games
World Athletics U20 Championships winners
21st-century Indonesian people